Hamish Scott Henderson (11 November 1919 – 9 March 2002) was a Scottish poet, songwriter, communist, intellectual and soldier.

He was a catalyst for the folk revival in Scotland. He was also an accomplished folk song collector and discovered such notable performers as Jeannie Robertson, Flora MacNeil and Calum Johnston.

Early life
Born on the first Armistice Day 11 November 1919, to a single mother, Janet Henderson, a Queen's Nurse who had served in France, then working in the war hospital at Blair Castle. Though he was born in Blairgowrie, Perthshire, Henderson spent his early years in nearby Glen Shee and eventually moved to England with his mother. He won a scholarship to the prestigious Dulwich School in London; however, his mother died shortly before he was due to take up his place and he was forced to live in an orphanage while studying there.

He studied Modern Languages at Downing College, Cambridge in the years leading up to World War II, and as a visiting student in Germany ran messages for an organization run by the Society of Friends aiding the German resistance and helping to rescue Jews.

World War II
Although he argued strongly for peace, even well into the early years of the war, he became convinced that a satisfactory peace could not be reached and so he threw himself into the war effort. Joining as an enlisted soldier in the Pioneer Corps, he later applied for and received a commission in the Intelligence Corps. He was quite effective as an interrogator due to his command of six European languages and deep understanding of German culture.

He took part in the Desert War in Africa, during which he wrote his poem Elegies For the Dead in Cyrenaica, encompassing every aspect of a soldier's experience of the sands of North Africa. On 2 May 1945, Henderson personally oversaw the drafting of the surrender order of Italy issued by Marshal Rodolfo Graziani.

Henderson collected the lyrics to  "D-Day Dodgers," a satirical song to the tune of "Lili Marlene", attributed to Lance-Sergeant Harry Pynn, who served in Italy. Henderson also wrote the lyrics to "The 51st (Highland) Division's Farewell to Sicily", set to a pipe tune called "Farewell to the Creeks". The book in which these were collected, Ballads of World War II, was published "privately" to evade censorship, but earned Henderson a ten-year ban from BBC radio, preventing a series on ballad-making from being made. His 1948 war poetry book, Elegies for the Dead in Cyrenaica, received the Somerset Maugham Award.

Folk song collector
Henderson threw himself into the work of the folk revival after the war, discovering and bringing to public attention Jeannie Robertson, Flora MacNeil, Calum Johnston (see Annie and Calum Johnston of Barra ) and others. In the 1950s, he acted as a guide to the American folklorist, Alan Lomax, who collected many field recordings in Scotland. (See Alan Lomax, Collector of Songs).

People's Festival Ceilidhs
Henderson was instrumental in bringing about the Edinburgh People's Festival Ceilidh in 1951, which placed traditionally performed Scottish folk music on the public stage for the first time as "A Night of Scottish Song". However, the People's Festival, of which it was part, was planned as a left-wing competitor to the Edinburgh Festival and was deeply controversial. At the event, Henderson performed The John Maclean March, to the tune of Scotland the Brave, which honoured the life and work John Maclean, a communist and Scottish nationalist hero.

However, the event marked the first time that Scotland's traditional folk music was performed on a public stage. The performers included Flora MacNeil, Calum Johnston, John Burgess, Jessie Murray, John Strachan, and Jimmy MacBeath. The event was extremely popular and was regarded as the beginning of the second British folk revival.

Henderson continued to host the events every year until 1954, when the Communist ties of several members of the People's Festival Committee led to the Labour Party declaring it a "Proscribed Organisation". Losing the financial support of the local trades unions, the People's Festival was permanently cancelled. Henderson's own songs, particularly "Freedom Come All Ye", have become part of the folk tradition themselves.

Later life
Dividing his time between Europe and Scotland, he eventually settled in Edinburgh in 1959 with his German wife, Kätzel (Felizitas Schmidt).

Henderson collected widely in the Borders and the north-east of Scotland, creating links between the travellers, the bothy singers of Aberdeenshire, the Border shepherds, and the young men and women who frequented the folk clubs in Edinburgh.

From 1955 to 1987 he was on the staff of the University of Edinburgh's School of Scottish Studies which he co-founded with Calum Maclean: there he contributed to the sound archives that are now available on-line. Henderson held several honorary degrees and after his retirement became an honorary fellow of the School of Scottish Studies. For many years he held court in Sandy Bell's Bar, the meeting place for local and visiting folk musicians. In April 1979, he was ' the prevailing spirit' at the first Edinburgh International Folk Festival conference 'The People's Past' both on ballads and in challenging traditional history telling. He also spoke at a  Riddle's Court meeting which had hosted in the past, the Workers' Educational Association when he said  that Calvinism was repressive in the Scottish psyche and that 'we had to divest ourselves of layers or preconception and misconception before we could come to grips with Scotland and its people.'

Henderson was a socialist, and beside his academic work for the University, he produced translations of the Prison Letters of Antonio Gramsci, whom he had first heard of among Communist Italian partisans during the war. The translation was published in the New Edinburgh Review in 1974 and as a book in 1988. He was involved in campaigns for Scottish home rule and in the foundation of the 1970s Scottish Labour Party. Henderson, who was openly bisexual, was vocal about gay rights and acceptance.

In 1983, Henderson was voted Scot of the Year by Radio Scotland listeners when he, in protest of the Thatcher government's nuclear weapons policy, turned down an OBE.

Death
He died in Edinburgh on 8 March 2002 aged 82, survived by his wife Kätzel and their daughters, Janet and Christine Henderson.

Legacy
Henderson's complexities make his work hard to study: for example, Dick Gaughan's commentary on the song-poem The 51st Highland Division's Farewell to Sicily, while insightful, does not take into account the traditional divide between pipers and drummers in the Scots regiments, the essential key to one reading of the text.

In 2005, Rounder Records released a recording of the 1951 Edinburgh People's Festival Ceilidh as part of The Alan Lomax Collection. Henderson had collaborated heavily with the preparations for the release.

In August 2013, Edinburgh University announced that it had acquired his personal archive of "more than 10,000 letters from almost 3400 correspondents, plus 136 notebooks and diaries", dating from the 1930s to the end of his life. These will be kept in the Special Collections department of the main library.

Discussions around national identity and constitutional resettlement in Scotland, especially those surrounding the Scottish Independence Referendum of 2014, have often invoked Henderson's legacy. Politicians and cultural commentators alike describe their admiration for his song 'Freedom Come-All-Ye' and lend their voices to those touting it as an alternative national anthem. As a radical democrat whose political beliefs were closely bound up in the study of folk culture and high literature, Henderson's work expresses a tension between romantic nationalism and socialist internationalism which has been reaffirmed in public life in Scotland since his death.

Debate on his parenting, and a possible link to the eighth Duke of Atholl or a 'cousin' of that lineage, has continued into considering the 'cultural  context' of the eighth Duke's role in designing the Scottish National War Memorial (opened 1927) bringing together the culture of 'the people', but also looking into Henderson possibly being possibly of royal or aristocratic blood, 'acknowledging a heritage that meant a lot to him, while still protecting his anonymity, and the power of his life's work to identify with everyman and everywoman.' Paul Potts had called Henderson "That guy? He's one of the wandering kings of Scotland."

Further reading
 Hamish Henderson (1947) Ballads of World War II, Caledonian Press, Glasgow 
 Hamish Henderson (1948) Elegies for the Dead in Cyrenaica, J. Lehmann, London 
 Hamish Henderson (1987), "Antonio Gramsci" in Ross, Raymond J. (ed.), Cencrastus No. 28, Winter 87/88, pp. 22 – 26, 
 Hamish Henderson (1995), Zeus as Curly Snake: The Chthonian Image, in Ross, Raymond (ed.), Cencrastus No. 52, Summer 1995, pp. 7 – 9, 
 Alec Finlay, editor (1992) Alias MacAlias: Writings on songs, folk and literature, Polygon, Edinburgh 
 Alec Finlay, editor (1996) The Armstrong Nose: Selected letters of Hamish Henderson, Polygon, Edinburgh 
 Geordie McIntyre (1973), Resurgimento!, an interview with Hamish Henderson, in Maisels, Chic K. (ed.), Folk Song and the Folk Tradition, Festival issue of the New Edinburgh Review, August 73, pp. 12 & 13
 Raymond Ross, editor (2000) Collected Poems and Songs, Curly Snake Pub., Edinburgh, Scotland  
 Eberhard Bort, editor (2010) Borne on the Carrying Stream: The Legacy of Hamish Henderson, Grace Note Publications 
 Eberhard Bort, editor (2011) Tis Sixty Years Since: The 1951 Edinburgh People's Festival Ceilidh and the Scottish Folk Revival 
 Jack Mitchell (1976), Hamish Henderson and the Scottish Tradition, in Burnett, Ray (ed.), Calgacus No. 3, Spring 1976, pp. 26 – 31, 
 Timothy Neat (2012) Hamish Henderson: Poetry Becomes People (1952-2002), Birlinn Ltd, Edinburgh 
 Corey Gibson (2015) The Voice of the People: Hamish Henderson and Scottish Cultural Politics, Edinburgh University Press, 
 Ian Spring (2020), Hamish Henderson: A Critical Appreciation, Rymour Books, Perth, 
 Fred Freeman (2022), "Burns, Hamish and Sang", Pairt 1, in Morton, Elaine & Hershaw, William, Lallans 100, Simmer 2022, pp. 111 - 119, 
 Tom Hubbard, "Hamish Henderson as Translator", in Hubbard, Tom (2022), Invitation to the Voyage: Scotland, Europe and Literature, Rymour, pp. 93 - 95,

References

External links
Scotsman obituary

1919 births
2002 deaths
Academics of the University of Edinburgh
People educated at Dulwich College
Scottish folklorists
Scottish humanists
Scottish Episcopalians
Scots Makars
Scottish soldiers
Scottish male songwriters
Scottish male poets
Scottish socialists
British Army personnel of World War II
Scottish musicologists
Scottish folk-song collectors
North African campaign
Italian campaign (World War II)
Intelligence Corps officers
Royal Pioneer Corps soldiers
People from Blairgowrie and Rattray
Alumni of Downing College, Cambridge
Scottish Renaissance
20th-century Scottish poets
Scottish LGBT poets
Scottish LGBT songwriters
Bisexual songwriters
Bisexual poets
Scottish translators
20th-century British translators
War poets
20th-century Scottish male writers
20th-century British musicologists
World War II poets
Bisexual academics
Claddagh Records artists
20th-century LGBT people